Club Deportivo Logroñés, S.A.D. was a Spanish football team based in Logroño, in the autonomous community of La Rioja. Founded in 1940, it last played in Regional Preferente de La Rioja.

Due to financial problems, since 2009 the club has not played in any competition. The club, who appeared in nine La Liga seasons, was replaced by UD Logroñés and SD Logroñés.

History
After Club Deportivo Logroño, the new Club Deportivo Logroñés saw the light of day after the Civil War, on 30 May 1940. Until 1950, it played in Tercera División, after which it achieved a second level promotion.

After falling short of reaching the top flight in 1952, Logroñés fluctuated between various levels of Spanish football. On 14 June 1987, already promoted Valencia CF visited Estadio Las Gaunas, and were defeated 1–0, as the Riojans gained first division rights for the first time ever.

In 1989–90, the team finished an all-time best seventh, just two points short of a UEFA Cup qualification, and would remain in the top level until 1997, save for a short return to level two in 1995–96, after it finished last the previous season with just 13 points.

After a double relegation in 1999–2000 (on the pitch and off it), it quickly returned to the third level, but new and worse economic problems arose, and the club was again relegated to Tercera in July 2004.

At the end of 2007–08, Logroñés returned once more to the fourth division due to its substantial salary commitments, in spite of the club's 13th-place finish in the season. Financial troubles continued into the first weeks of 2009, as only nine players took the field for its 4 January 2009 match against CD Arnedo, in protest against still overdue payments.

This was Logroñés' last match in the competition, as the side did not present itself at all for the next match, against CD Tedeón, and were therefore retired from the competition, being consequently relegated to Regional Preferente de La Rioja by the Royal Spanish Football Federation.

Season to season

9 seasons in La Liga
18 seasons in Segunda División
11 seasons in Segunda División B
29 seasons in Tercera División

Famous coaches

 Javier Irureta
 Miguel Ángel Lotina
 Víctor Muñoz
 Juande Ramos
 Quique Setién
 Blagoje Paunović

References

External links
Official website 
Documentation Project of CD Logroñés  
Unofficial fansite 

 
Sport in Logroño
Defunct football clubs in La Rioja (Spain)
Association football clubs established in 1940
1940 establishments in Spain
Segunda División clubs
La Liga clubs